Greengold Liners, known currently for sponsorship reasons as NBPOL Greengold Liners (New Britain Palm Oil Limited) and sometimes by their short name, Greengold FC, is an association football club based in New Britain, Papua New Guinea. 

Founded in 2018, the club competed in the Islands Conference of the 2019 Papua New Guinea National Soccer League, making their debut in the competition.

History 
The club was founded in 2018, shortly before the start of the 2019 Papua New Guinea National Soccer League. The club was one of five clubs drawn into the Islands Conference of the competition, and they played their first match on 24 February 2019 against West Tribe FC, drawing 0–0. The side drew their next two fixtures, before suffering their first defeat on 24 March, losing 4–3 against Chebu AROB FC to dent their chances of qualifying for the next stage. 

The second half of the season saw the side continue to fail to register a win, drawing 3–3 with Vudal Gazelle but losing their remaining three fixtures. The side eventually finished in 4th place, ahead of Gazelle, with four draws and four defeats.

Domestic Record

National Competitions 

 Papua New Guinea National Soccer League
2019: Islands Conference: 4th

References 

Football clubs in Papua New Guinea
Association football clubs established in 2018
2018 establishments in Papua New Guinea